is a Japanese athlete. He competed in the men's pole vault at the 1992 Summer Olympics.

References

1968 births
Living people
Athletes (track and field) at the 1992 Summer Olympics
Japanese male pole vaulters
Olympic athletes of Japan
Place of birth missing (living people)